Common-law marriage, also known as non-ceremonial marriage,  marriage, informal marriage, de facto marriage, or marriage by habit and repute, is a legal framework where a couple may be considered married without having formally registered their relation as a civil or religious marriage.

The original concept of a "common-law marriage" is one considered valid by both partners, but not formally recorded with a state or religious registry, nor celebrated in a formal civil or religious service. In effect, the act of the couple representing themselves to others as being married and organizing their relation as if they were married, means they are married.

The term common-law marriage (or similar) has wider informal use, often to denote relations that are not legally recognized as marriages. It is often used colloquially or by the media to refer to cohabiting couples, regardless of any legal rights or religious implications involved. This can create confusion in regard to the term and to the legal rights of unmarried partners (in addition to the actual status of the couple referred to).

Terminology
Common-law marriage is a marriage that takes legal effect without the prerequisites of a marriage license or participation in a marriage ceremony. The marriage occurs when two people who are legally capable of being married, and who intend to be married, live together as a married couple and hold themselves out to the world as a married couple.

Common-law marriage vs. cohabitation
The term "common-law marriage" is often used incorrectly to describe various types of couple relationships, such as cohabitation (whether or not registered) or other legally formalized relations. Although these interpersonal relationships are often called "common-law marriage", they differ from its original meaning in that they are not legally recognized as "marriages" but are a parallel interpersonal status such as a "domestic partnership", "registered partnership", "conjugal union" or "civil union". Non-marital relationship contracts are not necessarily recognized from one jurisdiction to another.

In Canada, while some provinces may extend to couples in marriage-like relationships many of the rights and responsibilities of a marriage, they are not legally considered married. They may be legally defined as "unmarried spouses" and for many purposes such as taxes and financial claims, and within those contexts treated the same as married spouses.

A 2008 poll in the UK showed that 51% of respondents incorrectly believed that cohabitants had the same rights as married couples.

In Scotland, common-law marriage does not exist, although there was a type of irregular marriage called 'marriage by cohabitation with habit and repute' which could apply to couples in special circumstances until 2006, and was abolished by the Family Law (Scotland) Act 2006 (irregular marriages established before 4 May 2006 are recognised).

History
In ancient Greece and Rome, marriages were private agreements between individuals and estates. Community recognition of a marriage was largely what qualified it as a marriage. The state had only limited interests in assessing the legitimacy of marriages. Normally, civil and religious officials took no part in marriage ceremonies and did not keep registries. There were several more or less formal ceremonies to choose from (partly interchangeable, but sometimes with different legal ramifications) as well as informal arrangements. It was relatively common for couples to cohabit with no ceremony; cohabiting for a moderate period of time was sufficient to make it a marriage. Cohabiting for the purpose of marriage carried with it no social stigma.

In medieval Europe, marriage came under the jurisdiction of canon law, which recognized as a valid marriage one in which the parties stated that they took one another as wife and husband, even in absence of any witnesses.

The Catholic Church forbade clandestine marriage at the Fourth Lateran Council (1215), which required all marriages to be announced in a church by a priest. The Council of Trent (1545–1563) introduced more specific requirements, ruling that future marriages would be valid only if witnessed by the pastor of the parish or the local ordinary (the bishop of the diocese) or by the delegate of one of said witnesses, the marriage being invalid otherwise, even if witnessed by a Catholic priest. The Tridentine canons did not bind the Protestants or the Eastern Orthodox, but clandestine marriages were impossible for the latter since their validity required the presence of a priest. England abolished clandestine or common-law marriages in the Marriage Act 1753, requiring marriages to be performed by a priest of the Church of England unless the participants in the marriage were Jews or Quakers. The Act applied to Wales but not to Scotland, which retained its own legal system by the Acts of Union 1707. To get around the requirements of the Marriage Act, such as minimum age requirements, couples would go to Gretna Green, in the south of Scotland, or other border villages such as Coldstream, to get married under Scots law. The Marriage Act 1753 also did not apply to Britain's overseas colonies of the time and so common-law marriages continued to be recognized in what are now the United States and Canada.

Marriages per verba de praesenti, sometimes known as common-law marriages, were an agreement to marry, rather than a marriage.

Legislation

Australia

Australia does not have common law marriage as it is understood under common law. The term used for relationships between any two persons who are not married, but are living in certain domestic circumstances, may vary between states and territories, although the term de facto relationship is often used.

Since March 1, 2009, de facto relationships have been recognized in the Family Law Act (Commonwealth), applicable in states that have referred their jurisdiction on de facto couples to the Commonwealth's jurisdiction. In Western Australia, the only state that has not referred its jurisdiction, state legislation is still valid. There is also no federal recognition of de facto relationships existing outside of Australia (see Section 51(xxxvii) of the Australian Constitution), and so this is also a state matter. Regulation of de facto relations is a combination of federal and state/territory laws.

Canada

Canada does not have the institution of common-law marriage within the meaning of the legal concept of such a marriage under the common-law, although common-law relationships are recognized for certain purposes in Canada. The Parliament of Canada has exclusive legislative authority over marriage and divorce in Canada under section 91(26) of the Constitution Act, 1867. Marriage is regulated throughout Canada by the Civil Marriage Act, and violations of the requirements of this act are subject to the Criminal Code of Canada ("Offenses Against Conjugal Rights" and "Unlawful Solemnization of Marriage" chapters, articles 290–296), also applicable throughout Canada.

By contrast, the regulation of non-marital relations, which are often referred to as "common-law spouses", falls largely under provincial law. As such, the legal definition and many implications of marriage-like relationships fall under provincial jurisdiction. As family law varies between provinces, there are differences between the provinces regarding the recognition of common-law relationships. Most such regulations deal with relations that are romantic/sexual in nature, but some, such as adult interdependent relationships in Alberta, do not have such a requirement and can apply to platonic relations, including relatives. In addition, the term "common law" appears informally in documents from the federal government. Common-law partners may be eligible for various federal government spousal benefits. Various laws include "common-law status", which automatically takes effect when two people (of any gender) have lived together in a conjugal relationship for a minimum period. In 1999, in its ruling M. v. H., the Supreme Court of Canada decided that same-sex partners would also be included in common-law relationships.
  
Around one-fifth of Canadian couples are in common-law relationships, a three-fold increase from 1981, according to 2016 data from Statistics Canada.

Federal 
Canada Revenue Agency (CRA) states, as of 2007, "living common-law" means living with a person in a conjugal relationship without being married and at least one of the following is true:

 the couple has been living in a conjugal relationship for at least 12 continuous months;
 the couple are parents of a child by birth or adoption; or
 one of the couple has custody and control of the other's child (or had custody and control immediately before the child turned 19 years of age) and the child is wholly dependent on that person for support.

Canada recognizes unmarried partners under certain circumstances for the purpose of immigration. Citizenship & Immigration Canada states that a common-law partner refers to a person who is living in a conjugal relationship with another person (opposite or same sex), and has done so continuously for a period of at least one year. A conjugal relationship exists when there is a significant degree of commitment between two people. This can be shown with evidence that the couple share the same home, that they support each other financially and emotionally, that they have children together, or that they present themselves in public as a couple. Common-law partners who are unable to live together or appear in public together because of legal restrictions in their home country or who have been separated for reasons beyond their control (for example, civil war or armed conflict) may still qualify and should be included on an application.

Alberta
See Adult interdependent relationship in Alberta.

British Columbia
The term "common-law marriage" does not appear in British Columbia (BC) law. A distinction is made between being a spouse and being married. Married couples include only those who have engaged in a legal marriage ceremony and have received a marriage licence. Spouses include married couples as well as those, of same or opposite gender, who satisfy criteria for being in a marriage-like relationship for a time period that depends on the law that is being considered. Hence the meaning of the term unmarried spouse in BC depends on the legal context. The criteria for a relationship being accepted as marriage-like include cohabitation for at least the specified period, unbroken by excessively long intervals that are unexplained by exigent circumstances. If dispute arises about whether the relationship was marriage-like, a court would consider a comprehensive set of further criteria including the domestic and financial arrangements, degree and nature of intimacy, and the sense of the relationship presented to friends and families (especially by each spouse to his/her own family). "Mere roommates will never qualify as unmarried spouses. There needs to be some other dimension to the relationship indicative of a commitment between the parties and their shared belief that they are in a special relationship with each other." The criteria do not exclude the existence of a previous marriage to a third person during the period of the marriage-like relationship of the unmarried spouses. Hence a person may have more than one spouse at the same time.

The implications of becoming an unmarried spouse include:

 Child support.  A spouse is responsible for contributing towards support of a child and possibly the other spouse if he/she is a biological or adoptive parent, or has contributed to support of the child for at least one year during the "marriage-like relationship" with the child's parent and the parent applies to the court for continuing support after separation and within one year of the last support contribution. (The contribution towards child support expected from a non-parent is not as great as from a parent.)  
 Financial support and division of property and debts after separation.  If the "marriage-like relationship" has continued for two years, the laws that apply upon separation are the same as those that apply to married couples, according to the "Estate Administration Act". All property and debts acquired prior to the relationship are exempt. If no agreement between the partners about property and/or debts is written during or after the relationship, then the law specifies equal sharing of all acquired during the relationship, as well as any changes in the value of those brought into the relationship. (There is an exemption from equal sharing for certain categories, such as gifts and inheritances received by one spouse.) The degree of participation  of each spouse in the acquisition of property or debt does not affect the sharing. Financial support may also be requested from the former spouse. A claim for financial support or the division of property and debt must be made within two years of the date of separation.
 Inheritance. A spouse is eligible for inheritance if the "marriage-like relationship" has existed for at least two years immediately prior to the death of the other spouse. All property and debts held in common are fully inherited automatically by the surviving spouse.  Those brought into the relationship are subject to any existing valid will, which may be vulnerable to challenge if it does not provide for the surviving spouse and any children.
 Benefits from government programs. Access to benefits from government programs or policies can become more (or less) available upon becoming an unmarried spouse. In general, these become similar or identical to those of married couples, but the criteria for qualifying as unmarried spouses, such as longevity of the relationship, differ for the various programs. Social assistance is often immediately reduced when there is perceived to be a "spouse in the house", regardless of the nature of the relationship.

Manitoba
See Common-law relationships in Manitoba.

New Brunswick
In New Brunswick, a couple must live together for three years or have a natural or adopted child together. They cannot have been married to another person during this time.

Nova Scotia
See Domestic partnership in Nova Scotia.

Ontario
In Ontario, section 29 of the Family Law Act specifically recognizes unmarried spouses in dealing with spousal support issues. The definition is having cohabited continuously for not less than three years or "in a relationship of some permanence" if parents of a child. However, common-law spouses do not have automatic rights under the Family Law Act to their spouses' property (section 29 applies only to the support sections of the Act). Thus, common-law partners do not have a statutory right to divide property in a breakup, and must ask courts to look to concepts such as the constructive or resulting trust to divide property in an equitable manner between partners.

Married people may also have a recognized common-law spouse even before being divorced from the first spouse.

Another difference that distinguishes common-law spouses from married partners is that a common-law partner can be compelled to testify against his or her partner in a court of law.

Quebec
The Civil Code of Quebec has never recognized a common-law partnership as a form of marriage. However, many laws in Quebec explicitly apply to common-law partners (called ) in " unions" (marriages being " unions") as they do to married spouses. However, common-law partners do not have any legal rights between them, such as alimony, family patrimony, compensatory allowance and matrimonial regime. The Quebec Court of Appeal ruled this restriction to be unconstitutional in 2010; but on January 25, 2013 the Supreme Court of Canada ruled that common-law couples do not have the same rights as married couples.

A 2002 amendment to the Civil Code recognizes a type of domestic partnership called a civil union that is similar to marriage and is likewise available to same-sex partners.  No citizen of Quebec can be recognized under family law to be in both a civilly married state and a  within the same time frame. Divorce from one conjugal relationship must occur before another conjugal relationship may occur in family law.

Same-sex partners can also marry legally in Quebec, as elsewhere in Canada.

Saskatchewan
In Saskatchewan, common-law relations are regulated by The Family Property Act and The Family Maintenance Act. Queen's Bench justices have sanctioned common-law relationships as simultaneously existing in family law while one or more of the spouses were also civilly married to others.

Denmark 
§ 27 of the historical Jyske Lov, which covered Funen, Jutland and Schleswig in the years 1241–1683, reads:

India 

In the case of D. Velusamy v D. Patchaiammal (2010), the Supreme Court of India defined, with reference to the Domestic Violence Act of 2005, "a relationship in the nature of marriage" as "akin to a common law marriage". The Supreme Court declared that the following are required to satisfy the conditions for a common-law marriage or a relationship in the nature of marriage:

 Must be of marriageable age.
 Must not be already married and is qualified to marry.
 Must be living together in a way that seems to society that the couple is married
 Must have cohabited for a "significant" period of time.
 Must be living together voluntarily.

There is no specified time for the common-law marriage to actually take effect but needs it to be "significant". The case clarified that there was a difference between "live-in relationships", "a relationship in the nature of marriage", casual relationships and having a "keep". Only "a relationship in the nature of marriage" can afford the rights and protections conferred in the Domestics Violence Act of 2005 and Section 125 of the Criminal Code, which include alimony for the female partner (unless she leaves her partner for no reason, had an affair with another man, or left with a mutual understanding, in which case alimony amounts must be settled mutually too), allowances, shelter and protections for the female partner in case of abuse, right to live in her partner's house and child custody. Furthermore, children born in such relationships will be granted allowances until they reach full age and, provided the person is not a married adult daughter, if the person is of full age and is handicapped. Furthermore, the Hindu Marriage Act stipulates that children born out of wedlock (including to live-in relationships, relationships in the nature of marriage and casual relationships) are treated as equivalent to legitimate children in terms of inheritance. However, the Hindu Marriage Act is only applicable if the children’s parent is Hindu, Sikh, Buddhist or Jain.

Ireland
Ireland does not recognize common-law marriage, but the Civil Partnership and Certain Rights and Obligations of Cohabitants Act 2010 gives some rights to unmarried cohabitants.

Israel
In Israel, courts and a few statutes (such as social security which grants death and disability benefits) have recognized an institute of  meaning a couple who are "known in the public" (lit. translation) as living together as husband and wife. Generally speaking the couple needs to satisfy two tests which are: 1) "intimate life similar to married couple, relationship based on same emotions of affection and love, dedication and faithfulness, showing they have chosen to share their fate" (Supreme Court of Israel, judge Zvi Berenson  (intimacy test)), and 2) sharing household (economic test). In addition courts usually are more likely to recognize such relationship as marriage for granting benefits if the couple could not get married under the Israeli law.

Israel's common-law status grants Israeli couples virtually the same benefits and privileges as married couples in Israel.

Kuwait 
Common-law marriage or partnerships have some limited recognition in Kuwait in the cases of expatriate familial disputes such as maintenance payments and child support dues. Family courts use the law of the male partner or husband's country of nationality to deal with family matters and hence if the male partner comes from a country where partnerships or other similar unions are recognised, then a Kuwaiti court can also consider it. However, intercourse out of marriage is illegal in Kuwait so such recognition can only practically apply in exceptional cases like in cases of illegitimate children born abroad and the parents have since separated abroad but relocated to Kuwait. No recognition is extended to couples where one or both parties are Kuwaiti or to homosexual couples.

United Kingdom

England and Wales
The term "common-law marriage" has been used in England and Wales to refer to unmarried, cohabiting heterosexual couples. However, this is merely a social usage. The term does not confer on cohabiting parties any of the rights or obligations enjoyed by spouses or civil partners. Unmarried partners are recognised for certain purposes in legislation: e.g., for means-tested benefits. For example, in the Jobseekers Act 1995, "unmarried couple" was defined as a man and woman who are not married to each other but who are living together in the same household as husband and wife other than in prescribed circumstances. But in many areas of the law cohabitants enjoy no special rights. Thus when a cohabiting relationship ends ownership of any assets will be decided by property law. The courts have no discretion to reallocate assets, as occurs on divorce.

It is sometimes mistakenly claimed that before the Marriage Act 1753 cohabiting couples would enjoy the protection of a "common-law marriage". In fact, neither the name nor the concept of "common-law marriage" was known at this time. Far from being treated as if they were married, couples known to be cohabiting risked prosecution by the church courts for fornication.

"Contract marriages" (or more strictly marriages ) could be presumed, before the Marriage Act 1753, to have been undertaken by mutual consent by couples who lived together without undergoing a marriage ceremony. However, they were not understood as having the legal status of a valid marriage until the decision in Dalrymple clarified this in 1811. This decision affected the subsequent development of English law due to the fact that the Marriage Act 1753 did not apply overseas. English courts later held that it was possible to marry by a simple exchange of consent in the colonies, although most of the disputed ceremonies involved the ministrations of a priest or other clergyman.

The English courts also upheld marriages by consent in territories not under British control but only if it had been impossible for the parties to marry according to the requirements of the local law. The late 1950s and early 1960s saw a spate of cases arising out of the Second World War, with marriages in prisoner-of-war camps in German-occupied Europe posing a particular problem for judges. (Some British civilians interned by the Japanese during the Second World War were held to be legally married after contracting marriages under circumstances where the formal requirements could not be met.) To this limited extent, English law does recognise what has become known as a "common-law marriage". English legal texts initially used the term to refer exclusively to American common-law marriages. Only in the 1960s did the term "common-law marriage" begin to be used in its contemporary sense to denote unmarried, cohabiting heterosexual relationships, and not until the 1970s and 1980s did the term begin to lose its negative connotations. The use of the term is likely to have encouraged cohabiting couples to believe falsely that they enjoyed legal rights. By the end of the 1970s a myth had emerged that marrying made little difference to one's legal rights, and this may have fuelled the subsequent increase in the number of couples living together and having children together outside marriage.

Scotland

Under Scots law, there have been several forms of "irregular marriage", among them:

 Irregular marriage by declaration de praesenti – declaring in the presence of two witnesses that one takes someone as one's wife or husband.
 Irregular marriage conditional on consummation
 Marriage contracted by correspondence
 Irregular marriage by cohabitation with habit and repute

The Marriage (Scotland) Act 1939 provided that the first three forms of irregular marriage could not be formed on or after 1 January 1940. However, any irregular marriages contracted prior to 1940 can still be upheld. This act also allowed the creation of regular civil marriages in Scotland for the first time (the civil registration system started in Scotland on 1 January 1855).

Until this act, the only regular marriage available in Scotland was a religious marriage. Irregular marriages were not socially accepted and many people who decided to contract them did so where they were relatively unknown. In some years up to 60% of the marriages in the Blythswood Registration District of Glasgow were "irregular".

In 2006, "marriage by cohabitation with habit and repute", the last form of irregular marriage that could still be contracted in Scotland, was abolished in the Family Law (Scotland) Act 2006. Until that act had come into force, Scotland remained the only European jurisdiction never to have totally abolished the old-style common-law marriage. For this law to apply, the time the couple had lived together continuously had to exceed 20 days.

As in the American jurisdictions that have preserved it, this type of marriage can be difficult to prove. It is not enough for the couple to have lived together for several years, but they must have been generally regarded as husband and wife. Their friends and neighbors, for example, must have known them as Mr. and Mrs. So-and-so (or at least they must have held themselves out to their neighbors and friends as Mr. and Mrs. So-and-so). Also, like American common-law marriages, it is a form of lawful marriage, so that people cannot be common-law spouses, or husband and wife by cohabitation with habit and repute, if one of them was legally married to somebody else when the relationship began.

It is a testament to the influence of American legal thought and English colloquial usage that, in a study conducted by the Scottish Executive in 2000, 57% of Scots surveyed believed that couples who merely live together have a "common-law marriage". In fact, that term is unknown in Scots law, which uses "marriage by cohabitation with habit and repute".

Otherwise, men and women who otherwise behave as husband and wife did not have a common-law marriage or a marriage by habit and repute merely because they set up housekeeping together, but they must have held themselves out to the world as husband and wife. (In many jurisdictions, they must do so for a certain length of time for the marriage to be valid.) The Scottish Survey is not clear on these points. It notes that "common-law marriage" is not part of Scots law, but it fails to note that "marriage by cohabitation with habit and repute", which is the same thing but in name, was part of Scots law until 2006.

United States

In the U.S., most states have abolished common-law marriage by statute. However, common-law marriage can still be contracted in eight states and the District of Columbia. Once they meet the requirements of common-law marriage, couples in those true common-law marriages are considered legally married for all purposes and in all circumstances.

Common-law marriage can still be contracted in Colorado, Iowa, Kansas, Montana, Rhode Island, Texas, Utah, Oklahoma and the District of Columbia.

All U.S. jurisdictions recognize common-law marriages that were validly contracted in the originating jurisdiction, although the extent to which the U.S. Constitution requires interstate marriage recognition has not been fully articulated by the Supreme Court. However, absent legal registration or similar notice of the marriage, the parties to a common law marriage or their eventual heirs may have difficulty proving their relationship to be marriage. Some states provide for registration of an informal or common-law marriage based on the declaration of each of the spouses on a state-issued form.

English-speaking Caribbean
Due to their colonial past, the islands of the English-speaking Caribbean have statutes concerning common-law marriage similar to those in England. However, in the Caribbean, the term "common-law" marriage is also widely described, by custom as much as by law, to any long term relationship between male and female partners. Such unions are widespread, making up a significant percentage of families, many of which have children and may last for many years. The reasons for people choosing common-law arrangements is debated in sociological literature. Although the acceptance of this type of union varies, men being more inclined to consider them as legitimate than women, they have become an institution.

See also
 Free love
 Nikah 'urfi
 Pacte civil de solidarité
 Putative marriage

Notes and references

Notes

References 

 
Family law
Types of marriage